Events from the year 1906 in Italy.

Kingdom of Italy
Monarch – Victor Emmanuel III (1900–1946)
Prime Minister – 
 Alessandro Fortis (1905–1906)
 Sidney Sonnino (1906)
 Giovanni Giolitti (1906–1909)
Population – 33,718,000

Events

The Italian film industry takes shape, led by three major organizations: Cines, founded in 1906 in Rome; and the Turin-based companies Ambrosio Film, founded by pioneering filmmaker Arturo Ambrosio in 1906, and Itala Film. Other companies soon followed in Milan and Naples, and these early companies quickly attained a respectable production quality and were able to market their products both within Italy and abroad.
Giosuè Carducci is the first Italian to win the Nobel Prize in Literature in 1906 "not only in consideration of his deep learning and critical research, but above all as a tribute to the creative energy, freshness of style, and lyrical force which characterize his poetic masterpieces".

January
 January 9 – Mount Vesuvius near Naples initiates activity; indications are that the volcano is becoming increasingly active.

February
 February 2 – Prime Minister Alessandro Fortis resigns. 
 February 3 – Mount Vesuvius erupts again. The next weeks the activity of the volcano increases.
 February 8 – Sidney Sonnino forms a new Cabinet, representing the Historical Right. Giolitti does not openly oppose Sonnino, but his followers of the Historical Left do.

April
 April 5 – Mount Vesuvius in Campania erupts, killing over 100 people and ejecting the most lava ever recorded from a Vesuvian eruption. Italian authorities were preparing to hold the 1908 Summer Olympics when Mount Vesuvius erupted, devastating the province of Naples. Funds were diverted to the reconstruction of Naples, requiring a new location for the Olympics to be found.
 April 10 – The lava flow from Mount Vesuvius, which had almost ceased, starts again in the direction of Torre Annunziata; reaches the cemetery of that town and then turns in the direction of Pompeii.
 April 28 – The Milan International world's fair opens in Milan. It would receive 4,012,776 visits and covered .

May
 May 6 – The first Targa Florio, an open road endurance automobile race, starts in the mountains of Sicily near Palermo. The race was initiated by Vincenzo Florio and is considered to be the oldest sports car racing event.
 May 18 – Prime Minister Sidney Sonnino is forced to resign. He proposed major changes to transform Southern Italy, which provoked opposition from the ruling groups.
 May 19 – The Simplon railway tunnel, connecting Brig, Switzerland and Domodossola, Italy, through the Alps, is inaugurated.
 May 29 – Giovanni Giolitti forms a new Cabinet.

October
 October 1 – Foundation of the Socialist labour union, the Confederazione Generale del Lavoro (General Confederation of Labour) in Milan.

Births
 May 8 – Roberto Rossellini, Italian film director (d. 1977)
 June 2 – Carlo Scarpa, Italian architect (d. 1978)
 June 12 – Sandro Penna, Italian poet (d. 1977)
 June 13 – Bruno de Finetti, Italian probabilist, statistician and actuary (d. 1985)
 August 5 – Ettore Majorana, Italian theoretical physicist who worked on neutrino masses (disappeared 1938)
 October 16 – Dino Buzzati, Italian author and journalist (d. 1972)
 November 2 – Luchino Visconti, Italian theatre and cinema director and writer (d. 1976)

Deaths
 September 1 – Giuseppe Giacosa, Italian poet and librettist (b. 1847)
 October 9 – Adelaide Ristori, Italian actress (b. 1822)

References

 
Italy
Years of the 20th century in Italy